Prediction models may refer to:
 Financial forecast or stock market prediction in finance
 Free-space path loss in telecommunications
 Predictive inference in statistics